is a Japanese voice actress and narrator. She was previously affiliated with Vi-Vo and is currently affiliated with Aoni Production. Her major roles include Ritsuko Akagi in Neon Genesis Evangelion, Nico Robin in One Piece, Sonia in Eureka Seven and Nurse Joy in Pokémon.

Filmography

Animation

Film

Tokusatsu

Drama CD

Video games

Dubbing
Independence Day: Resurgence, Elizabeth Lanford (Sela Ward)

References

External links
 Official agency profile 
 
 
 

1965 births
Living people
Voice actresses from Osaka Prefecture
Japanese video game actresses
Japanese voice actresses
Aoni Production voice actors